Ashta Lakshmi (Sanskrit: अष्टलक्ष्मी, IAST: Aṣṭalakṣmī; lit. "Octet of Lakshmi") or Ashtalakshmi, is a group of the eight manifestations of Lakshmi, the Hindu goddess of prosperity. She presides over eight sources of wealth: spirituality, material wealth, agriculture, royalty, knowledge, courage, progeny, and victory.

Ashta Lakshmi is always depicted and worshipped in an octet in temples.

Iconography

Adi Lakshmi

Adi Lakshmi (Primeval Lakshmi) is portrayed to be the earliest form of Lakshmi.

Adi Lakshmi is the manifestation who supports a seeker to reach their source, or Atman. She is believed to proffer dhyana, a state of absolute silence, bliss, and peace. This aspect of the goddess is responsible for the furtherance in the quest for spiritual wealth.

She is depicted as four-armed, carrying a lotus and a red flag, and other two arms expressing the abhaya mudra (fearlessness pose) and the varada mudra (blessing pose).

Dhana Lakshmi

Dhana Lakshmi (Wealth Lakshmi) is Lakshmi in her form as the goddess of material wealth.

Dhana Lakshmi is depicted with six hands, in red garments, carries the Sudarshana Chakra, shankha, kalasha (a water pitcher with mango leaves and a coconut on it) or the Amrita Kalasha (a pitcher containing Amrita – the elixir of life), a bow and arrow, a lotus, and an arm performing the abhaya mudra, with gold coins falling from it.

Dhanya Lakshmi

Dhanya Lakshmi (Grain Lakshmi) is the form of Lakshmi who represents the wealth of agriculture. Dhanya Lakshmi is also the aspect of Lakshmi who provides resources to adherents for their sustenance and well-being.

She is depicted as eight-armed, dressed in green garments, carrying two lotuses, a gada (mace), paddy crop, sugarcane, and bananas. Her hands express the abhaya mudra and the varada mudra.

Gaja Lakshmi

Gaja Lakshmi (Elephant Lakshmi) is the giver of animal wealth (such as cattle), or the being who offers royal splendour, according to the Narayana Pancharatra.

According to Hinduism, Gaja Lakshmi restored the potent lost by Indra (King of the devas) during the Samudra Manthana. Vasudha Narayanan has interpreted this name as the, "one who is worshipped by elephants".

She is depicted as four-armed, donning red garments, carrying two lotuses, two arms expressing the abhaya mudra and the varada mudra, surrounded by two elephants bathing her with water pots.

Santana Lakshmi

Santana Lakshmi (Eternal Lakshmi) is the goddess's manifestation who bestows offspring.

She is depicted as six-armed, carrying two kalashas (water pitcher with mango leaves and a coconut on it), a sword, a shield, a child on her lap, a hand in abhaya mudra, and the other holding a child. The child holds a lotus.

Dhairya Lakshmi

Dhairya Lakshmi (Courage Lakshmi), or Veera Lakshmi (Valourous Lakshmi), is a form of Lakshmi inspired by Durga. She is the form of the goddess who bestows valour during battles and courage plus strength for overcoming difficulties in life.

She is depicted as eight-armed, seated on a lion, in red garments, carrying a chakra, shankha, bow, arrow, trishula (or a sword), a bundle of palm leaf scriptures, other two hands in the abhaya mudra and the varada mudra.

Vijaya Lakshmi

Vijaya Lakshmi or Jaya Lakshmi (Victorious Lakshmi) is also a manifestation drawn from Durga. She is form of the goddess who bestows victory, not only in battles, but also for conquering hurdles in order to achieve success.

She is depicted as eight-armed, dressed in blue garments, carrying the chakra, shankha, sword, shield, lotus, pasha, and other two hands expressing the abhaya mudra and the varada mudra.

Vidya Lakshmi

Vidya Lakshmi (Knowledge Lakshmi) is the goddess and the bestower of knowledge of arts and the sciences. 

She is dressed in a white saree and has a resemblance to the goddess Saraswati. She holds a book of the Vedas, a peacock feather as a pen, the varada mudra and the abhaya mudra.

Other forms

In some Ashta Lakshmi lists, other forms of Lakshmi are included:

Aishwarya Lakshmi (Auspicious Lakshmi): The goddess who bestows auspices, and the only form of Lakshmi who mounts a horse. She generally replaces Vidya Lakshmi from the Ashta Lakshmi list.
Saubhagya Lakshmi (Fortune Lakshmi): The manifestation who furnishes good fortune.
Rajya Lakshmi (Royal Lakshmi): The form of Lakshmi who bestows majesty, revered by monarchs.
Vara Lakshmi (Boon Lakshmi): The form of the goddess who bestows boons. This form of Lakshmi is celebrated on the occasion of Varalakshmi Vratam.

Worship
The prayer Shri Ashta Lakshmi Stotram lists all of the Ashta Lakshmi, in which the goddess is depicted as seated on a lotus. The rise in popularity of the Ashta Lakshmi can be linked with the rising popularity of the Ashta Lakshmi Stotram.
Around the 1970s, a leading Sri Vaishnava theologian, UV Srinivasa Varadachariar, published a hymn called Ashta Lakshmi Stotram dedicated to the eight forms of Lakshmi.  Narayanan comments:

Ashta Lakshmi is now widely worshipped both by Sri Vaishnava and other Hindu communities in South India. Occasionally, Ashta Lakshmi is depicted together in shrines or in "framing pictures" within an overall design and are worshipped by votaries of Lakshmi who worship her in her various manifestations. In addition to emergence of Ashta Lakshmi temples since the 1970s,  traditional silver articles used in home worship as well as decorative jars (kumbha) now appear with the Ashta Lakshmi group molded on their sides.

Books, popular prayers manuals, pamphlets sold outside temples in South India, ritual worship, and "a burgeoning audiocassette market" also presently popularise the octet of Lakshmi.

Temples

 Ashtalakshmi Temple, Besant Nagar, Chennai, Tamil Nadu, India: The Ashta Lakshmi Kovil, built in 1974, is the first shrine dedicated exclusively to the Ashta Lakshmi where Lakshmi is given greater importance than Vishnu. It has eight small shrines arranged in clockwise direction, dedicated to the Ashta Lakshmi and then a ninth shrine dedicated to Vishnu and Lakshmi together, unlike the traditional separate shrines.
 Ashtalakshmi Temple, Vasavi Colony, Dilsukh Nagar, Hyderabad, Andhra Pradesh, India 
 Sydney Durga Temple - The Hindu Temple, located in Regents Park, Sydney, Australia has 8 small sanctums dedicated to the Ashta Lakshmi. 
 Ashtalakshmi Temple, Sugar Land, Houston, Texas, United States 
 Ashtalakshmi Temple, North Hollywood, California, United States 
 At the entrance - leading from Vittavasal Street to Meenakshi Temple, Madhurai, a mandapam (Hall) called Ashta Lakshmi Mandapam is dedicated to the Ashta Lakshmi, the statues of which support the roof on either side.
 Parashakthi Temple, Pontiac, Michigan has the deities installed there.
 Asta Lakshmi Devasthanam, Fremont, California. Address incorrect, call to find out.
Sree Vasudevapuram Mahavishnu temple situated in Ernakulam district of Kerala India conducts the Ashtalakshmi Thampoolasamprana Mahotsavam every year starting on the eve of Akshaya Tritheye. The belief is that Maha Lakshmi gives darshan and shower blessings on devotees only on  eight days in a year as Ashta Lakshmi. The most auspicious ritual of the temple known as the Thampoolasamarpanam  is performed during the mahotsavam.

See also
 Lakshmi
 Star of Lakshmi

References

Further reading
 Studies in Hindu and Buddhist Art By P. K. Mishra, Published 1999, Abhinav Publications,413 pages, 
 Vasudha Narayanan in Chapter ŚRĪ: Giver of Fortune, Bestower of Grace  in book Devī: Goddesses of India By John Stratton Hawley, Donna Marie Wulff; Published 1996; University of California Press; 373 pages;

External links
 Ashtalakshmi Kovil, Chennai

Hindu goddesses
Abundance goddesses
Fortune goddesses
Lakshmi